Alison McGhee (born July 8, 1960) is an American author, who has published several picture books, books for children, and adult novels. She is a New York Times bestselling author, and the winner of numerous awards.

Education
McGhee attended Holland Patent High School, in New York and Middlebury College in Vermont.

Career 
McGhee's first novel, Rainlight, follows the characters left behind after the sudden and accidental death of Starr Williams. It received positive reviews and won both the Great Lakes College Association National Fiction Award and the Minnesota Book Award in 1999. McGhee's sophomore effort, Shadow Baby, is witnessed through the eyes of a young girl who befriends an old man as part of a school project. It was a Pulitzer Prize nominee. McGhee continued her adult themes with 'Was It Beautiful?.

She then began writing children's pictures. Countdown to Kindergarten and Mrs. Watson Wants Your Teeth, both share the same main character who begins the first story as she enters kindergarten and is in first grade by the second book. Turning her hand to young adult novels, McGhee introduced Snap and All Rivers Flow to the Sea.

In Only a Witch Can Fly McGhee focuses on poetry. In this story-poem, created in sestina form, a little girl dreams about flying on her broom.

McGhee is also a professor of creative writing at Metropolitan State University in Saint Paul, Minnesota.

Personal life
McGhee is single with three grown children.

Bibliography

Novels for adults
1998 - Rainlight
2000 - Shadow Baby
2003 - Was It Beautiful?
2007 - Falling Boy
2018 - Never Coming Back
2020 - The Opposite of Fate

Young adult and middle-grade novels
1999 - Snap
2018 - What I Leave Behind

Picture books
2002 - Countdown to Kindergarten - Illustrated by Harry Bliss
2004 - Mrs. Watson Wants Your Teeth - Illustrated by Harry Bliss
2006 - A Very Brave Witch - Illustrated by Harry Bliss
2007 - Someday - Illustrated by Peter H. Reynolds
2008 - Bye-bye, Crib - Illustrated by Ross MacDonald
2008 - Little Boy - Illustrated by Peter H. Reynolds
2009 - Always - Illustrated by Pascal Lemaitre
2009 - Song of Middle C - Illustrated by Scott Menchin
2009 - Only a Witch Can Fly - Illustrated by Taeeun Yoo
2010 - So Many Days - Illustrated by Taeeun Yoo
2011 - Making a Friend, illustrated by Marc Rosenthal
2013 - The Case of the Missing Donut, illustrated by Isabel Roxas
2014 - Star Bright, illustrated by Peter H. Reynolds
2015 - The Sweetest Witch Around, illustrated by Harry Bliss
2016 - Tell Me a Tattoo Story, illustrated by Eliza Wheeler
2017 - Percy, Dog of Destiny, illustrated by Jennifer K. Mann
2020 - World So Wide, illustrated by Kate Alizadeh

Awards
 2011 Theodor Seuss Geisel Award with co-author Kate DiCamillo and illustrator Tony Fucile (Bink and Gollie)
 1999 Minnesota Book Award (Rainlight)
 2000 Minnesota Book Award (Shadow Baby)
 2003 Minnesota Book Award (Countdown to Kindergarten'')
 2008 Minnesota Book Award (All Rivers Flow to the Sea)
 2017 Christopher Award (Firefly Hollow)
 The Great Lakes College Association National Fiction Award

Notes

External links
 http://www.alisonmcghee.com/
 http://authors.simonandschuster.com/Alison-McGhee

1960 births
Novelists from Minnesota
20th-century American novelists
21st-century American novelists
American women novelists
Living people
20th-century American women writers
21st-century American women writers